Alim Louis Benabid is a French-Algerian emeritus professor, neurosurgeon and member of the French Academy of Sciences, who has had a global impact in the development of deep brain stimulation (DBS) for Parkinson's disease and other movement disorders. He became emeritus professor of biophysics at the Joseph Fourier University in Grenoble in September 2007, and chairman of the board of the Edmond J. Safra Biomedical Research Center in 2009 at Clinatec, a multidisciplinary institute he co-founded in Grenoble that applies nanotechnologies to neurosciences.

Biography 
Alim Louis Benabid was born May 2, 1942, in Grenoble, France. The son of a doctor from Algeria and of a French nurse, Benabid was quoted as saying he could not easily decide between studying physics or medicine. He received his medical degree in 1970 and a doctorate in physics in 1978, both from Joseph Fourier University (now part of the Université Grenoble Alpes) in Grenoble. He became a staff neurosurgeon at Joseph Fourier University in 1972, professor of experimental medicine in 1978, and professor of biophysics from 1983 to 2007. Benabid also had a fellowship in 1979 – 1980 in preclinical neuropharmacology in the laboratory of Floyd Bloom at the Salk Institute in La Jolla, California. From 1988 to 2007, he directed the preclinical neurosciences unit at the French biomedical and public health research institution INSERM, and from 1989 to 2007, served as head of the neurosurgery department at the University Hospital of Grenoble. In other roles, Benabid coordinated the Claudio Munari Center for Surgery of Epilepsy and Movement Disorders at Ospedale (Hospital) Niguarda in Milan, Italy from 1998 to 2007, and was a staff consultant at the Cleveland Clinic Foundation in Ohio from 2000 to 2003.

In 2007, Benabid joined the French Commissariat d'Energie Atomique as a scientific adviser during the time a campus for public-private innovation was being created, the Grenoble Innovation for Advanced New Technologies campus, which includes the Minatec research complex and the life-science cluster NanoBio. In 2009, he became chairman of the board of the Edmond J. Safra Biomedical Research Center at Clinatec, a translational biomedical technology organization he helped found within Minatec. Clinatec was jointly created by CEA-LETI (Laboratoire d'électronique des technologies de l'information—an applied micro- and nanotechnology subsidiary of CEA), Grenoble University Hospital, INSERM and Joseph Fourier University.
In 2013, when awarding Benabid a $100,000 Robert A. Pritzker Prize for Leadership in Parkinson's Research to fund continued research, the Michael J. Fox Foundation said in its award announcement that Benabid had published 523 scientific papers, achieving an H Index of 67, as well as given 18 honorary lectures, and received 23 medals and prizes.

Deep brain stimulation neurosurgery 
Benabid developed stereotactic surgery methods for brain surgery in patients who had brain tumors or certain types of movement disorder.

As part of the work, he and his team members created tissue banks using tissue from brain tumor biopsies. The tissue samples were used to characterize brain tumors by oncogenic mapping. Studies of genomics and proteomics have highlighted the factors involved in tumor progression and led to therapeutic advances such as anti-angiogenic factors.

For patients with Parkinson's disease, Benabid and Pierre Pollak, a neurologist at the University Hospital of Grenoble, also developed deep brain stimulation (DBS) in 1987.

Parkinson's disease is commonly treated with medicines such as levodopa to improve muscle control, balance and walking, but higher dosages tend to be needed over time in this progressive neurological condition, and long-term use can lead to motor fluctuations such as tremor, rigidity or slowness.

Prior to development of DBS, the main surgical treatment for Parkinson's disease was lesioning to inhibit involuntary abnormal motion associated with severe Parkinson's disease not controlled by optimal medication. As described in a 2010 interview with Benabid in the medical journal Lancet, electrical stimulation was used during surgery to locate the ablation target and predict lesioning effects. To precisely locate the right area, an electrode would be placed around the target and those surrounding areas stimulated with physiological frequencies of 20 – 50 Hz while observing the patient's movement. Since electrical stimulation itself sometimes seemed to quiet tremor during the procedure, Benabid reasoned this might be a solution. He tested from very low frequencies of 1, 5, 10 Hz and more up to 100 Hz, which mimicked effects of ablation without destroying tissue. Initially the thalamus was stimulated. Later animal studies indicated the subthalamic nucleus might be a more effective stimulation target. As technology advanced to allow such stimulation to be continuously applied for a long time, DBS became widely adopted in the 1990s for treatment of movement disorders such as Parkinson's disease, essential tremor, and dystonia.

A meta-analysis of six randomized controlled trials published in 2014 showed that in 1,184 study subjects, DBS significantly improved untreated motor symptoms of Parkinson's disease, permitting a reduction in medication doses and their associated complications; as well as contributing moderately, during the phase when the patients were taking Parkinson's disease medication, to fewer motor symptoms, greater function, and more quality of life.

Honors and awards 
Benabid has received a number of awards and honors from various countries, including:

Honorary degrees
 Honorary degree, National University of Ireland, Galway (2005)
 Honorary degree, University of Western Ontario, London, Canada
 Honorary degree, McGill University, Montreal, Canada

See also 
 Stereotactic surgery

References

External links

Michael J. Fox Foundation for Parkinson's Research
Parkinson's Disease Foundation

Parkinson's disease researchers
French neurosurgeons
French people of Algerian descent
20th-century French physicians
Biomedical engineers
Translational medicine
History of neuroscience
1942 births
Living people
Physicians from Grenoble
Grenoble Alpes University alumni
Members of the French Academy of Sciences
Recipients of the Lasker-DeBakey Clinical Medical Research Award
French transhumanists
French bioengineers
20th-century surgeons